This is a list of films which have placed number one at the weekend box office in the United Kingdom during 2010.

Films

Notes

References

See also
List of British films of 2010

External links
UK Box Office at Digital Spy
UK Box Office at the Internet Movie Database
UK Box Office Archive at the Internet Movie Database
UK Box Office at Virgin Media

2010
United Kingdom
2010 in British cinema

ja:2009年イギリス週末興行収入1位の映画の一覧